Anti-Fascist Committee may refer to:

 Jewish Anti-Fascist Committee
 Finnish Anti-Fascist Committee
 Anti-Fascist Committee of Cham Immigrants
  Estonian Anti-Fascist Committee
  Anti-Fascist Committee of the Soviet Youth
 Anti-Fascist Committee of National Liberation for Northern Italy
 Anti-Racist/Anti-Fascist Co-ordinating Committee